Tin Angel Records is a British independent record label.

History
Tin Angel Records has founded in 2007 with Devon Sproule's Keep Your Silver Shined. The album received critical acclaim and led to Sproule appearing live on Later... with Jools Holland. Other notable records for the label in 2007 were by Paul Curreri and Adrian Crowley, with Crowley's album Long Distance Swimmer receiving a nomination for the 2007 Choice Music Prize. In 2008, Tin Angel released the self-titled album by Polar Bear, the follow-up to their Mercury Music Prize-nominated Held On The Tips Of Fingers. The label has since released records by the likes of Baby Dee, Charlie Parr and Evening Hymns (whose album Spectral Dusk was longlisted for the 2013 Polaris Music Prize) and branched into book publishing in 2012 with the release of Little Annie's autobiography You Can't Sing The Blues While Drinking Milk. Tin Angel hosted a showcase at North by Northeast 2013 in Toronto.

Current roster
Baby Dee
Batsch
Mich Cota/Kizis
Peter Zummo 
Crack Cloud
John Southworth
Devon Sproule
N0V3L
Ed Askew
Deliluh
Nicholas Krgovich
Marker Starling
Eliza Niemi
Sing Leaf
Opal Onyx
Pick A Piper
Ian Daniel Kehoe
Ryan Driver
Mabe Fratti

References

External links
Official Bandcamp

British independent record labels